Manas International Airport  is the main international airport in Kyrgyzstan, located  north-northwest of the capital Bishkek.

History
The airport was constructed as a replacement for the former Bishkek airport that was located to the south of the city, and named after Kyrgyz epic hero, Manas, suggested by writer and intellectual Chinghiz Aitmatov. The first plane landed at Manas in October 1974, with Soviet Premier Alexei Kosygin on board. Aeroflot operated the first scheduled flight to Moscow–Domodedovo on 4 May 1975.

When Kyrgyzstan gained independence from the Soviet Union in 1991, the airport began a steady decline as its infrastructure was neglected for almost ten years and a sizable aircraft boneyard developed. Approximately 60 derelict aircraft from the Soviet era, ranging in size from helicopters to full-sized airliners, were left in mothballs on the airport ramp at the eastern end of the field.

With the beginning of Operation Enduring Freedom, the United States and its coalition partners immediately sought permission from the Kyrgyz government to use the airport as a military base for operations in Afghanistan. Coalition forces arrived in late December 2001 and immediately the airport saw unprecedented expansion of operations and facilities. The derelict aircraft were rolled into a pasture next to the ramp to make room for coalition aircraft, and large, semi-permanent hangars were constructed to house coalition fighter aircraft. Additionally, a Marsden Matting parking apron was built along the Eastern half of the runway, along with a large cargo depot and several aircraft maintenance facilities. A tent city sprang up across the street from the passenger terminal, housing over 2,000 troops. The American forces christened the site "Ganci Air Base", after New York Fire Department chief Peter J. Ganci, Jr., who was killed in the 11 September terrorist attacks. It was later given the official name of Manas Air Base, renamed Transit Center at Manas in 2009, and closed and handed over to Kyrgyz authorities in 2014.

In 2004, a new parking ramp was added in front of the passenger terminal to make room for larger refueling and transport aircraft such as the KC-135 and C-17.

Around the same time the Kyrgyz government performed a major expansion and renovation of the passenger terminal, funded in part by the sizable landing fees paid by coalition forces. Several restaurants, gift shops, and barber shops sprang-up in the terminal catering to the deployed troops.

The airport terminal underwent renovation and redesign in 2007. The contemporary IATA codename FRU originates from the Soviet name of the city of Bishkek, then called Frunze. In 2012, the airport handled 1,056,000 passengers.

Facilities
The airport operates 24 hours and its ILS system meets ICAO CAT II standards, enabling flight operations in low ceiling and visibility.

During its existence Kyrgyzstan Airlines had its head office on the airport property. On 2 January 2002 the airline moved its head office to the Kyrgyzstan Airlines Sales Agency building of Manas International Airport. Previously the head office was also on the grounds of the airport.

Airlines and destinations

Passenger

Cargo

Chartered
Air India operated special flights in 2020 to bring back stranded Indians in Kyrgyzstan due to restrictions caused by COVID-19.

Aerostan is a cargo carrier operating out of Bishkek, which focuses on chartered cargo flights.

Statistics

Annual traffic

Accidents and incidents
On 23 October 2002, an IL-62 airliner operated by the Tretyakovo Air Transport Company crashed on takeoff after running off the end of the runway. There were no passengers aboard and all eleven crew members escaped, with only minor injuries. The pilot was pulled from the aircraft by responding U.S. Air Force Security Forces personnel of the 111th SFS from the Pennsylvania Air National Guard. The injured were treated at the joint US Air Force and South Korean army clinic at Manas Air Base. The wreckage was bulldozed by Kyrgyz personnel and left at the site. Airport operations resumed before the crash site had finished smoldering.
On 26 September 2006, a Kyrgyzstan Airlines Tupolev Tu-154 aircraft taking off for Moscow–Domodedovo collided on the runway with a US Air Force KC-135 tanker that had just landed. The Tupolev, with 52 passengers and nine crew on board, lost part of its wing but was able to take off and return to make a safe landing with a 2.5 m section of its wing missing. The KC-135, with three crew members and a cargo of jet fuel, caught fire and was destroyed. There were no injuries on either aircraft.
On 24 August 2008, Iran Aseman Airlines Flight 6895 (a Boeing 737 operated by Itek Air) heading to Tehran with 90 people aboard crashed  from the airport, killing 68. Twenty-two people, including two crew members, survived the crash. According to an airport official, the crew had reported a technical problem on board and were returning to the airport when the plane went down.
On 28 December 2011, a Kyrgyzstan Airlines Tu-134, which had taken off from Bishkek, attempted to land at Osh. The jet, carrying 80 passengers and six crew, rolled off the runway, broke its wing, overturned and caught fire. 31 people were injured, with 17 of these hospitalised.
On 16 January 2017, Turkish Airlines Flight 6491, a Boeing 747-400F operated by ACT Airlines under wet lease for Turkish Cargo, en route from Hong Kong to Istanbul via Bishkek, missed the runway on landing in thick fog, crashing into a village. At least 38 people were killed, including all four crew members and 34 people on the ground.

See also

List of the busiest airports in the former USSR
Transportation in Kyrgyzstan

References

External links 

Manas International Airport (official site)
Manas International Airport (globalsecurity.org)

Airports in Kyrgyzstan
Airports established in 1974
Airports built in the Soviet Union
Soviet Air Force bases
Chüy Region
1974 establishments in Asia
1974 establishments in the Soviet Union
Installations of the United States Air Force
Buildings and structures in Bishkek
Transport in Bishkek